Katarina Erikintytär Nipertz (d. 1487) was a Swedish noblewoman and  fiefholder of Raseborg Castle, Sweden (now Finland).

She was married to Ivar Axelsson till Lillö, fiefholder of Raseborg. Upon his death in 1483, she took control of the castle and fief. In 1487, the regent Sten Sture the Elder appointed a new fiefholder of Raseborg and sent troops there to take over the castle, and she defended it for several weeks.
Her daughter Margareta Laurensdotter Tott was married to Kristiern Bengtsson (Oxenstierna) the younger (1475-1520) who became one of the victims in the Stockholm Bloodbath in November 1520.

References

Other sources
 Suomen kansallisbiografia (National Biography of Finland)

15th-century Swedish nobility
Women in 15th-century warfare
15th-century Finnish nobility
Finnish women in war
Women in medieval European warfare
Women of medieval Finland
15th-century Swedish women